Stelletta is a genus of sea sponges belonging to the family Ancorinidae.

Species
The following species are recognised in the genus Stelletta:
Stelletta addita (Topsent, 1938)
Stelletta aeruginosa Carter, 1886
Stelletta agglutinans (Dendy, 1905)
Stelletta agulhana Lendenfeld, 1907
Stelletta anancora (Sollas, 1886)
Stelletta anasteria Esteves & Muricy, 2005
Stelletta anthastra Lehnert & Stone, 2014
Stelletta arenaria Bergquist, 1968
Stelletta aruensis Hentschel, 1912
Stelletta atrophia Hoshino, 1981
Stelletta beae Hajdu & Carvalho, 2003
Stelletta bocki Rao, 1941
Stelletta boglicii Schmidt, 1862
Stelletta brevidens (Topsent, 1897)
Stelletta brevioxea Pulitzer-Finali, 1993
Stelletta brevis Hentschel, 1909
Stelletta calyx Sim & Kim, 2003
Stelletta capensis Lévi, 1967
Stelletta carolinensis (Wells, Wells & Gray, 1960)
Stelletta cavernosa (Dendy, 1916)
Stelletta centroradiata Lévi & Lévi, 1983
Stelletta centrotyla Lendenfeld, 1907
Stelletta clarella de Laubenfels, 1930
Stelletta clavosa Ridley, 1884
Stelletta colombiana (Wintermann-Kilian & Kilian, 1984)
Stelletta communis (Sollas, 1886)
Stelletta conulosa Bergquist, 1968
Stelletta crassicula Carter, 1881
Stelletta crassispicula (Sollas, 1886)
Stelletta crater Dendy, 1924
Stelletta crusta Shim & Sim, 2009
Stelletta cyathoides Burton, 1926
Stelletta cylindrica Thomas, 1973
Stelletta debilis Thiele, 1900
Stelletta defensa Pulitzer-Finali, 1983
Stelletta dendyi (Sollas, 1888)
Stelletta dichoclada Pulitzer-Finali, 1983
Stelletta digitata (Pulitzer-Finali, 1993)
Stelletta digitifera (Lévi, 1959)
†Stelletta discoidea Rutot, 1874 
Stelletta discolor Bösraug, 1913
Stelletta dorsigera Schmidt, 1864
Stelletta durissima Bergquist, 1965
Stelletta eduardoi Desqueyroux-Faúndez & van Soest, 1997
Stelletta estrella de Laubenfels, 1930
Stelletta farcimen Lendenfeld, 1907
Stelletta fibrosa (Schmidt, 1870)
Stelletta fibulifera Schmidt, 1880
Stelletta freitasi Lévi, 1964
Stelletta gigantea Tanita, 1965
Stelletta gigas (Sollas, 1886)
Stelletta globulariformis (Wilson, 1902)
Stelletta grubii Schmidt, 1862
Stelletta grubioides Burton, 1926
Stelletta hajdui Lerner & Mothes, 1999
Stelletta herdmani Dendy, 1905
Stelletta hispida (Buccich, 1886)
Stelletta horrens Kirkpatrick, 1902
Stelletta hyperoxea Lévi & Lévi, 1983
Stelletta incrustata Uliczka, 1929
Stelletta individua (Schmidt, 1870)
Stelletta inermis (Topsent, 1904)
Stelletta japonica Lebwohl, 1914
Stelletta jonesi (Thomas, 1973)
Stelletta kallitetilla (de Laubenfels, 1936)
Stelletta kieschnicki Van Soest & Hooper, 2020
Stelletta kundukensis Sim, 1996
Stelletta lactea Carter, 1871
Stelletta latiancora Topsent, 1928
Stelletta lithodes Bergquist, 1968
Stelletta longicladus Dendy & Burton, 1926
Stelletta makushina Lehnert & Stone, 2014
Stelletta mamilliformis Carter, 1886
Stelletta maori Dendy, 1924
Stelletta mauritiana (Dendy, 1916)
Stelletta maxima Thiele, 1898
Stelletta mediterranea (Topsent, 1893)
Stelletta megaspina Lendenfeld, 1907
Stelletta misakensis Lebwohl, 1914
Stelletta morikawai Tanita, 1961
Stelletta moseleyi (Sollas, 1888)
Stelletta naseana Thiele, 1898
Stelletta normani Sollas, 1880
Stelletta novaezealandiae Brøndsted, 1924
Stelletta obtusus (Lendenfeld, 1907)
Stelletta orientalis Thiele, 1898
Stelletta orthotriaena Koltun, 1966
Stelletta osculifera (Lévi, 1964)
Stelletta ovalae Tanita, 1965
Stelletta pachydermata (Sollas, 1886)
Stelletta parva (Row, 1911)
Stelletta parvispicula (Sollas, 1886)
Stelletta paucistellata Lévi, 1952
Stelletta phialimorpha Lévi, 1993
Stelletta phrissens Sollas, 1886
Stelletta pisum Thiele, 1898
Stelletta plagioreducta Lévi, 1961
Stelletta porosa Kieschnick, 1896
Stelletta pudica (Wiedenmayer, 1977)
Stelletta pulchra (Sollas, 1886)
Stelletta pulvinata (Lamarck, 1815)
Stelletta pumex (Nardo, 1847)
Stelletta purpurea Ridley, 1884
Stelletta pygmaeorum Schmidt, 1880
Stelletta pyriformis (Sollas, 1886)
Stelletta radicifera Wilson, 1925
Stelletta retroclada Lévi, 1967
Stelletta rhaphidiophora Hentschel, 1929
Stelletta ridleyi (Sollas, 1886)
Stelletta ruetzleri Mothes & Silva, 2002
Stelletta rugosa Burton, 1926
Stelletta sandalinum Brøndsted, 1924
Stelletta siemensi Keller, 1891
Stelletta sigmatriaena Lendenfeld, 1907
Stelletta simplicissima (Schmidt, 1868)
Stelletta solida Tanita, 1963
Stelletta solidissima (Wilson, 1902)
Stelletta soteropolitana Cosme & Peixinho, 2007
Stelletta sphaerica Burton, 1926
Stelletta sphaeroides Kieschnick, 1896
Stelletta spinulosa Sim & Kim, 2003
Stelletta splendens Tanita, 1965
Stelletta stellata Topsent, 1893
Stelletta stellifera Kieschnick, 1896
Stelletta stenospiculata Uliczka, 1929
Stelletta subtilis (Sollas, 1886)
Stelletta tenuis Lindgren, 1897
Stelletta tenuispicula (Sollas, 1886)
Stelletta teres Lebwohl, 1914
Stelletta tethyoides Lendenfeld, 1888
Stelletta tethyopsis Carter, 1880
Stelletta tethytimeata Calcinai, Bastari, Bertolino & Pansini, 2017
Stelletta tetrafurcata Hoshino, 1981
Stelletta thomasi Van Soest & Hooper, 2020
Stelletta toxiastra Lévi, 1993
Stelletta trichotriaena Dendy & Burton, 1926
Stelletta trisclera Lévi, 1967
Stelletta tuba Lebwohl, 1914
Stelletta tuberculata (Carter, 1886)
Stelletta tuberosa (Topsent, 1892)
Stelletta tulearensis Vacelet, Vasseur & Lévi, 1976
Stelletta vaceleti Lévi & Lévi, 1983
Stelletta validissima Thiele, 1898
Stelletta variabilis (Wilson, 1902)
Stelletta variohamata Thiele, 1900
Stelletta ventricosa (Topsent, 1904)
Stelletta vervoorti Van Soest, 2017
Stelletta vestigium Dendy, 1905
Stelletta vosmaeri (Sollas, 1886)
Stelletta wilsoni Van Soest & Hooper, 2020

References 

Tetractinellida